Fürstenberg-Fürstenberg was a territory in Swabia, which was located in present-day southern Baden-Württemberg, Germany. It was ruled by the House of Fürstenberg in the Circle of Swabia during the Holy Roman Empire.

History
The territory consisted at times of two historical states, which were both named after the state of Fürstenberg and the Fürstenberg Castle. The first state was created in 1408 as a partition of the county of Fürstenberg. After the death in 1441 of its only count, Henry VII, it was partitioned between Fürstenberg-Baar and Fürstenberg-Geisingen.

The second state emerged as a county in 1704, as a partition of Fürstenberg-Stühlingen. It was raised to a principality in 1716, then was partitioned between itself and Fürstenberg-Pürglitz in 1762, after the death of Prince Joseph Wilhelm Ernst (1699–1762).

The last male of the Fürstenberg-Fürstenberg branch was Prince Charles Joachim (1771–1804). Upon his death in 1804, the principality was inherited by the Princes of Fürstenberg-Pürglitz, who descended from Prince Joseph Wilhelm Ernst's second son.

Count of Fürstenberg-Fürstenberg (1408–41) 
Henry VII, Count from 1408–41

Count of Fürstenberg-Fürstenberg (1704–16) 
Joseph Wilhelm Ernst, Count from 1704–16 (1699–1762), great-great-grandson of Christoph II, Count of Fürstenberg

Princes of Fürstenberg-Fürstenberg (1716–1804) 

 Joseph Wilhelm Ernst, 1st Prince from 1716–62 (1699–1762)
  Joseph Wenceslaus, 2nd Prince from 1762–83 (1728–1783), eldest son of Joseph Wilhelm Ernst
 Joseph Maria Benedict, 3rd Prince from 1783–96 (1758–1796)
  Charles Joachim, 4th Prince from 1796–1804 (1771–1804)

Upon the extinction of this line in 1804, the principality passed to the Princes of Fürstenberg-Pürglitz.

References

Fürstenberg (princely family)
Principalities of the Holy Roman Empire
States and territories established in 1408
States and territories established in 1704
1400s establishments in the Holy Roman Empire
1408 establishments in Europe
1704 establishments in the Holy Roman Empire